Matthäus Taferner (born 30 January 2001) is an Austrian professional footballer who plays as midfielder for Wolfsberger AC.

Club career

Wacker Innsbruck
Taferner began his career at Wacker Innsbruck. In 2015 he joined the Fußballakademie Tirol, while attending the Bundes-Oberstufenrealgymnasium Innsbruck, a gymnasium with a branch for competitive athletes.

On 27 May 2017, Taferner, who had already attracted the interest of German club SC Freiburg, made his debut for the reserve team of Wacker Innsbruck in the Austrian Regionalliga when he was substituted in place of Sandro Gavrić in the 60th minute of a 2–1 loss to USC Eugendorf.

In September 2017, Taferner was promoted to the first team by coach Karl Daxbacher. He made his debut in the second-tier First League in the same month when he was substituted for Daniele Gabriele in the 84th minute of the Tyroleans' 4–0 away win over Austria Lustenau on 29 September 2017. This appearance meant that he became the first player in the second tier of Austian football who was born in the 21st century. With Wacker Innsbruck he won promotion to the Austrian Football Bundesliga at the end of the season.

He made his debut in the Bundesliga in April 2019 in a 3–1 defeat against SV Mattersburg. The following month he scored his first goal in the highest Austrian league in a 4–0 win, also against Mattersburg. At the end of the season, he suffered relegation with Innsbruck after one season, finishing in last place in the Bundesliga table.

Dynamo Dresden
On 25 June 2019, 2. Bundesliga club Dynamo Dresden confirmed that they had signed Taferner from Wacker Innsbruck on a four-year contract. In Dresden, the midfielder only played four times and was sent on loan to his former club Wacker Innsbruck in January 2020.

Wolfsberger AC
In the summer of 2020, he returned to Austria, signing for Wolfsberger AC for an undisclosed fee.

International career
On 24 April 2016, Taferner made his debut for Austria U15 in a 3–3 draw against their peers from Mexico at the Wörthersee Stadion in Klagenfurt. Further appearances followed on 26 April against Norway and on 29 April against Brazil. On 9 April 2017, he played in his Tyrolean homeland, in Jenbach, in the friendly international match against Turkey (1–3) for the Austrian U16 national team.

In the summer of 2017, he was selected by coach Rupert Marko for the Austria U17 team for the international Toto Cup. On 30 August 2017, he scored his first international goal in Sillian in the 79th minute of the match, putting the finishing touches to a 4–0 victory in the friendly against peers from Finland. In total, Taferner played five games for the U17 team.

In March 2021, Taferner made his international debut for the Austria U21 team against Saudi Arabia.

Honours
Wacker Innsbruck
 Austrian Football First League: 2017–18

References

External links
Matthäus Taferner at ÖFB

2001 births
Living people
Sportspeople from Klagenfurt
Footballers from Carinthia (state)
Austrian footballers
Austria youth international footballers
Austria under-21 international footballers
FC Wacker Innsbruck (2002) players
Dynamo Dresden players
Wolfsberger AC players
Austrian Football Bundesliga players
2. Liga (Austria) players
2. Bundesliga players
Austrian expatriate footballers
Expatriate footballers in Germany
Austrian expatriate sportspeople in Germany
Association football midfielders